Little Red is the second studio album by British singer Katy B. It was released on 7 February 2014 by Rinse, Columbia Records and Sony Music. The album includes the singles "5 AM", "Crying for No Reason" and "Still". The album is her first number 1 on the UK Albums Chart.

Singles
"5 AM" was released as the lead single on 4 November 2013. It reached number 14 on the UK Singles Chart. "Crying for No Reason" was released as the album's second single on 26 January 2014. It debuted at number five on the UK Singles Chart. "Still" was released as the album's third single on 2 May 2014.

Other songs
"What Love Is Made Of" was released on 5 July 2013 and reached number 21 on the UK Singles Chart; however, the song did not make the album's final cut. "Aaliyah", originally released as part of the Danger EP, received extensive airplay on the likes of BBC Radio 1 and became part of the album.

Promotion

Tour
On 12 November 2013 it was announced that Katy B will be doing a five-date UK tour. A date for London's Roundhouse in October 2014 was added on 17 January 2014. On 5 March 2014, full tour dates for October were added.

Critical reception

The album received generally positive reviews, with an average score of 74/100 on Metacritic.

Track listing

Personnel
Credits adapted from Little Red album liner notes.

 Katy B – vocals
 Geeneus – engineer, producer
 DJ Zinc – engineer, keys, mixing
 The Invisible Men – engineer, producer
 Jessie Ware – vocals
 Sampha – producer, vocals
 Phil Tan – mixing
 Joey Dyer – keys, programming
 Jon Shave – keys, programming
 Jarrad Hearman – engineer, mixing
 George Fitzgerald – mixing, production
 Glenn Callaghan – keys
 Jacques Greene – producer 
 Jason Pebworth – keys
 George Astaslo – programming

 Moto Blanco – producer
 Joker – producer
 Adam Harris – Guitar
 Tom Forrest – mixing
 Route 94 – producer
 Largo – engineer, producer
 Al Shux – mixing, producer
 Huxley – producer
 Fraser T Smith – producer
 Beatriz Artola – engineer
 M.J. Cole – engineer, producer
 Stuart Hawkes – mastering
 Simon Emmett – photography
 Give Up Art – art direction, design

Chart performance

Weekly charts

Year-end

Certifications

Release history

References

2014 albums
Katy B albums
Columbia Records albums
Albums produced by Al Shux
Albums produced by Fraser T. Smith